Thomas or Tom Peterson or Petersen may refer to:

Thomas Mundy Peterson (1824–1904), first African American to vote in an election under the U.S. Constitution
Tommy Peterson (footballer) (1898–1950), Australian rules footballer
Tom Peterson (1930–2016), American retailer, pitchman and television personality
Tom Peterson (cyclist) (born 1986), American professional road racing cyclist
Thomas C. Peterson, American climatologist
Thomas E. Petersen, Commissioner of the Minnesota Department of Agriculture

See also
Tom Petersson (born 1951), American musician, member of Cheap Trick
Thomas Ring Petersen (born 1980), better known as Thomas Ring, Danish singer
Tom Pettersen (1935–1994), Norwegian swimmer
Tom Pettersson (born 1990), Swedish footballer
Peterson (name)